This article is about South Korean clubs' performance in the Asian Club Championship which became defunct in 2002. A total of nine clubs represented South Korea in the Asian Club Championship. South Korean clubs won the championship seven times and three times of runner-up.

Participations 
 W/O : Withdraw, P : Play-off, G : Group Round, S : Semifinalist, R : Runner-up, W : Winner

South Korea club statistics

Busan IPark

Chungeui FC

Daehan Tungsten FC

FC Seoul

Pohang Steelers

Seongnam FC

Suwon Samsung Bluewings

Ulsan Hyundai

Yangzee FC

Overall statistics

South Korea vs. Asian leagues

Bangladesh

China

India

Indonesia

Iran

Iraq

Israel

Japan

Kuwait

Macau

Malaysia

Maldives

Myanmar

Philippines

Qatar

Saudi Arabia

Sri Lanka

Syria

Thailand

Uzbekistan

Vietnam

See also
AFC Champions League
South Korean clubs in the AFC Champions League

References
 Asian Champions' Cup on RSSSF
The Dong-a Ilbo Article
Kyunghyang Sinmun Article

1967
 
South Korean football club records and statistics
Football clubs in the AFC Champions League